Sierichstraße is a rapid transit station on the Hamburg U-Bahn line U3. The station was opened in May 1912 and is located in the Hamburg district of Winterhude, Germany. Winterhude is part of the borough of Hamburg-Nord.

Service 
Sierichstraße is served by Hamburg U-Bahn line U3; departures are every 5 minutes.

Gallery

See also 

 List of Hamburg U-Bahn stations

References

External links 

 Line and route network plans at hvv.de 

Hamburg U-Bahn stations in Hamburg
U3 (Hamburg U-Bahn) stations
Buildings and structures in Hamburg-Nord
Railway stations in Germany opened in 1912